The Gletscherhorn (3,983 m) is a mountain of the Bernese Alps, located on the border between the Swiss cantons of Bern and Valais. It forms the eastern edge of the Lauterbrunnen Wall, south of the Jungfrau.

See also

List of mountains of the Alps above 3000 m
List of mountains of Switzerland

References

External links
Gletscherhorn on Hikr

Mountains of Switzerland
Mountains of the Alps
Alpine three-thousanders
Bernese Alps
Mountains of Valais
Mountains of the canton of Bern
Bern–Valais border
Three-thousanders of Switzerland